Tacna Historical Museum (Spanish: Museo Histórico Regional de Tacna) is a museum located in the center of the city of Tacna, Peru.

In the rooms, you can see documents and objects from the time of the emancipation, independence, and the war with Chile.

In the same building (located at Calle Apurimac 202) there is a Tacna Public Library. The building was designed in the Republican style and built in 1957.

References
Notes

 i perú (2014), "Información de Tacna".

Museums in Peru
Buildings and structures in Tacna Region
Tourist attractions in Tacna Region